Tim Horan AM (born 18 May 1970) is a former Australian rugby union footballer. He played for the Queensland Reds in the Super 12, and represented Australia. He was one of the best centres in the world throughout the 1990s due to his attacking prowess, formidable defence and playmaking ability. He became one of only 21 players who have won the Rugby World Cup on multiple occasions.

As well as inside centre, Horan also played fly-half and earned one international cap on the wing.

Early career
Horan's rugby career began at Toowoomba's Downlands College under First XV coach John Elders, a former coach of England. The Downlands First XV of 1987 was undefeated throughout the year, including matches against Sydney's Kings, Riverview and St Joseph's colleges. The side also included future Wallabies Brett Johnstone, Brett Robinson, Garrick Morgan, and Peter Ryan.

He initially partnered Jason Little, with whom he wrote a book, Perfect Union and later in his career, Daniel Herbert. Horan and Little met when they were 13 years old, rooming together for a rugby league representative team.

Horan played a role in Australia winning the 1999 Rugby World Cup. He was voted player of the tournament (winning himself a year's worth of Guinness for scoring the fastest try).

Wallabies
His debut came in 1989 against New Zealand, where he impressed his opposite number, Joe Stanley, so much that Stanley gave Horan his Test jersey and told him to keep his own as it was his first. In his next Test, he and Little marked the experienced French pair of Franck Mesnel and Philippe Sella, and Horan scored his first two Test tries. That year, in what has become a famous incident in Australian Rugby, both he and Jason Little were subjected to a mock bar room ceremony in which they pledged not to defect to Rugby league.

After winning the World Cup in 1991, in which he scored four tries and a successful Bledisloe Cup in 1992, the Wallabies endured a mixed 1993. 1994 saw Horan's career nearly end with a horrific knee injury in the Super 10 final and he would spend over a year in rehabilitation before making the squad to the 1995 World Cup defence in South Africa.

In 1996 he captained the national side for the first and only time and he also played at flyhalf. He missed the 61–22 loss to South Africa but returned for a 15-all draw with England, helping Ben Tune and George Gregan score a try apiece.

He peaked again for the 1999 World Cup against South Africa in the semi-final. Despite suffering from severe food poisoning the night before the match, he played against South Africa in a 27-21 extra-time win. This was followed by the second Wallaby World Cup win of his career.

2000 was to be his final Test year and was affected by injuries. He signed for English club Saracens.

Retirement
Horan began a career as a newspaper columnist and broadcaster. Horan headed the Sports and Entertainment business in Private and Premium Banking for Westpac Banking Corporation until 2018 when he joined London based investment specialist River and Mercantile as Managing Director of its Australia and New Zealand operation. He is an ambassador for Spinal Injuries Australia, speaking to school children regarding prevention of spinal injuries. Horan is an ambassador for the Modified Rugby Program (MRP) that provides modified games of rugby for boys and girls with learning and perceptual difficulties. He is also ambassador for Aunties and Uncles - a non-profit organisation offering friendship, role-modelling and support for children in single parent or parentless families. He was inducted into the Sport Australia Hall of Fame in 2006, and in the 2009 Australia Day Honours he was appointed a Member of the Order of Australia (AM), "for service to Rugby Union football, particularly as an international representative player, and to the community through promoting awareness of spinal injury prevention and support for youth mentoring organisations."
Horan's father is Mike Horan, the former National Party and Liberal National Party Member of Parliament for the Queensland electoral district of Toowoomba South.

Played 80 test caps
119 state caps
130 points
40 tries

Post-playing career
Tim Horan has been a commentator for Fox Sports Australia since September 2010. In 2011 Horan joined Triple M's Sunday Rugby show The Ruck with Matt Burke. In February 2021, Horan was announced as a part of the Stan Sport commentary team to cover Super Rugby AU.

Honours
Horan was inducted into both the World Rugby Hall of Fame and the Australian Rugby Union Hall of Fame in 2015.

References

External links
 Sporting Heroes Profile

1970 births
Australian Institute of Sport rugby union players
Australian rugby union players
Australia international rugby union players
Queensland Reds players
Living people
Rugby union centres
Barbarian F.C. players
Saracens F.C. players
World Rugby Hall of Fame inductees
Australian rugby union captains
Members of the Order of Australia
Sport Australia Hall of Fame inductees
Australian rugby union commentators
Rugby union players from Sydney